Dhubab is a small coastal town in the Taiz Governorate of south-western Yemen. It is the seat of Dhubab District.

History
During World War I, British patrol vessels shelled Dhubab fort in November 1914. They later opened fire on Yakhtul on 8 December 1914, damaging 7 or 8 dhows moored there.

Geography
Dhubab lies on the coast of the Red Sea on a jutting headland, 46.6 kilometres by road south of Mocha and north of Mayyun.

References

Populated places in Taiz Governorate
Populated coastal places in Yemen